The 1996–97 Minnesota Golden Gophers men's basketball team represented the University of Minnesota during the 1996–97 NCAA Division I men's basketball season. The team, coached by Clem Haskins, played their home games in Williams Arena in Minneapolis, Minnesota as members of the Big Ten Conference. They finished the season 31–4, 16–2 in Big Ten play to win the Big Ten championship. They received the conference's automatic bid to the NCAA tournament as the No. 1 seed in the Midwest region. There they defeated Southwest Texas State and Temple to advance to the Sweet Sixteen. In the Sweet Sixteen, they defeated Clemson and UCLA to advance to the Final Four for the first time in school history. There they lost to Kentucky.

In 1999, an academic fraud scandal revealed that Minnesota academic counseling office manager Jan Gangelhoff had done coursework for at least 20 Minnesota basketball players since 1993. Four players from the Minnesota basketball team were immediately suspended, pending an investigation for academic fraud. Head coach Clem Haskins, men's athletic director Mark Dienhart, and university vice president McKinley Boston all resigned. The NCAA sanctioned Minnesota by vacating all appearances in the 1994, 1995, and 1997 NCAA Tournaments and 1996 and 1998 National Invitation Tournaments, as well as individual records of those student-athletes found to have committed academic fraud. The NCAA further issued show-cause penalties for Haskins and Newby (both until October 23, 2007) and Gangelhoff (until October 23, 2005). The Gophers were also stripped of the Big Ten title due to the scandal.

Roster

Schedule and results

|-
!colspan=9 style=|Non-conference regular season

|-
!colspan=9 style=|Big Ten regular season

|-
!colspan=9 style=|NCAA tournament

Rankings

Awards
Team MVP
 Bobby Jackson

References

Minnesota Golden Gophers
Minnesota Golden Gophers men's basketball seasons
NCAA Division I men's basketball tournament Final Four seasons
Minnesota
Minne
Minne